Nyron Paul Henry Nosworthy (born 11 October 1980) is a former professional footballer. After beginning his career with Gillingham, he moved to Sunderland in 2005 with whom he played in the Premier League. After two lengthy loan spells with Sheffield United he made a permanent switch to Watford in 2012 but was released in the summer of 2014 after a loan to Bristol City. Born in Brixton, South London, England, Nosworthy represented Jamaica at international level, playing fourteen games and scoring once.

Early Club career

Gillingham
Nosworthy began his career as a trainee at Gillingham from the age of 18. As a junior player Nosworthy played initially as a midfielder, but his first team debut, on 28 November 1999 against Fulham, came in attack. His first team debut was unusual in that he came on as a first-half substitute but was himself substituted later in the match. Following this Nosworthy made appearances in wide midfield and at left-back and centre-back before cementing his position as a right-back towards the end of the 2000–01 season. The following season, he appeared regularly for Gillingham, and was named as the club's Young Player of the Season. 

His primary position was at the back though sometimes played up front and was occasionally used as an emergency striker with some success, scoring twice in a 2–1 win over Crystal Palace in the last game of the 2002–03 season, a result which helped Gillingham to its highest ever league finish of 11th in the second tier. Nosworthy was named as the Kent side's Player of the Season for 2002–03. 

Nosworthy's contract expired at the end of the 2004–05 season, which saw Gillingham relegated to League One. Keen to play at a higher level, and aware of interest from other clubs, he chose not to accept a new deal with the club so left as a free agent.

Sunderland
Nosworthy signed for Sunderland on a free transfer on 13 June 2005. Expecting to start as backup to regular right back Stephen Wright, he was introduced to the FA Premier League rather sooner than anticipated when Wright sustained a serious knee injury after only one game.
Nosworthy took full advantage of the opportunity, starting the majority of Sunderland's games.

In January 2007, new manager Roy Keane moved him to play at centre half instead of at full back. Nosworthy claimed that the additional concentration and organisation skills required to play in central defence improved his game. This improvement, which was also acknowledged by his then manager, combined with consistency of performance in his new role, led the club to extend his contract until June 2010. He was subsequently voted Sunderland's Player of the Season for 2006–07 despite facing stiff competition and mainly due to his improved performances that season. Sunderland fans famously used to chant " they tried to get the ball past Nyron but he said no no no" to the tune of Amy Winehouse's "Rehab", he also acted as the club's "Kick It Out" anti-racism campaign ambassador during this period.

Nosworthy remained with Sunderland, playing regularly through relegation and subsequent promotion back to the Premier League. With the arrival of new manager Steve Bruce he found his appearances became more limited and he was eventually allowed to leave on loan to Sheffield United in February 2010, agreeing a deal to remain with the Blades until the end of the season. He stayed the remainder of the season at Bramall Lane, playing 19 times at centre half and right back.

In July 2010 he was again loaned to Sheffield United on a season long loan deal without a recall clause. He was a regular starter in the Blades back four for most of the season but with the team in freefall, and all but relegated, he was released early from his loan deal and returned to Sunderland in mid-April 2011, having played a further thirty two times for the Yorkshire club.

Watford
After falling out of favour at Sunderland once again, it was confirmed on 28 October 2011 that he had joined Watford on loan until 8 January 2012. He made 12 league appearances including a 4–2 victory over Bradford City in the FA Cup third round, a day before his loan was due to end. Shortly after the end of his loan, Nosworthy signed permanently for Watford on 10 January 2012, on a two and a half year contract.

Nosworthy scored his first Watford goal in a 3–2 win against Burnley on 3 March 2012. It was his first goal in almost nine years. He also scored an own goal in the same game which gave Burnley a 2–0 lead in the 50th minute. Nosworthy played was an important part of Gianfranco Zola's squad during the 2012–13 season, making 19 league appearances before injuring his Achilles whilst on international duty with Jamaica in March 2013 – effectively ending his season.

Nosworthy returned from his injury to play five successive league games in late 2013. However, upon Zola's departure he found himself out of favour and later joined Bristol City on loan until the end of the season. Nosworthy was released by Watford in June 2014, after two and a half years at Vicarage Road.

On 14 March 2014, Nosworthy joined League One side Bristol City on an initial 30-day loan period. and made his Bristol City debut in a 0–0 draw at home to Swindon Town the following day. The loan was extended until the end of the 2013–14 season in April.

Blackpool

Nosworthy joined Lee Clark's Blackpool in November 2014, in a short-term deal until January 2015. Nosworthy was among the 17 players released by Blackpool following their relegation to League One in 2015.

Portsmouth
On 19 March 2015 Nosworthy was loaned to Portsmouth until the end of the season.

Dagenham & Redbridge
In June 2015, Nosworthy signed for League Two side Dagenham & Redbridge on a one-year deal.

Nosworthy retired from football in February 2016 after losing his place in the team.

International career
Nosworthy stated his ambitions to play international football for Jamaica, his father's country. He was also eligible to play for Guyana through his mother. On 4 October 2007 Nosworthy received his first call-up to the full Jamaica squad for their games against Ghana and Honduras. Nosworthy received another call up to Jamaica's international team in May 2012 along with teammate Adrian Mariappa. He made his international debut for Jamaica against Guyana on 19 May 2012. Nosworthy scored his first goal for Jamaica in a World Cup qualifier against Antigua and Barbuda, Jamaica won the game 4–1.

Nosworthy was called up to the 2014 Caribbean Cup squad and played in Jamaica's opening game against Martinique.

Personal life 
Nosworthy is a cousin of footballer Ethan Pinnock. He is a strong supporter of Arsenal.

Career statistics

Club

International

International goals
Jamaica score listed first, score column indicates score after each Nosworthy goal.

Honours
Gillingham

 Football League Second Division play-offs: 2000

Sunderland

 Football League Championship: 2006–07

Individual

 Gillingham Young Player of the Season: 2001–02
 Gillingham Player of the Season: 2002–03
 Sunderland Player of the Season: 2006–07

References

External links

1980 births
Living people
Footballers from Brixton
English footballers
English people of Jamaican descent
English people of Guyanese descent
Jamaican footballers
Jamaica international footballers
Association football defenders
Gillingham F.C. players
Sunderland A.F.C. players
Sheffield United F.C. players
Watford F.C. players
Bristol City F.C. players
Blackpool F.C. players
Portsmouth F.C. players
Dagenham & Redbridge F.C. players
Premier League players
English Football League players
Black British sportspeople
2014 Caribbean Cup players